T. Inglis Moore (1901-1978) was an Australian writer, anthologist and academic who was born in Camden, New South Wales.

Moore was the fifth of seven children and was educated at Sydney Grammar School and University of Sydney where he received a B.A. in 1923, graduating with first-class honours in English, history and philosophy. He was awarded a James King of Irrawang travelling scholarship and studied politics, philosophy and economics at The Queen's College, Oxford receiving a B.A. in 1926 and an M.A. in 1933. In 1927 he married Peace Flavelle Little stepsister/cousin of Elaine Marjory Little they had one child Pacita in 1934 

Moore taught in universities in Iowa and the Philippines before returning to Sydney in 1931, where he taught at the university.  From 1934-1940 he was a leader-writer and literary reviewer for The Sydney Morning Herald, before enlisting in the Australian Imperial Force in July 1940. After the war he taught at Canberra University College, which was later amalgamated with the Australian National University.  He was promoted to associate professor in 1959, and retired in 1966.

Moore was a member of the advisory board of the Commonwealth Literary Fund from 1945 to 1971 and was a passionate supporter of Australian literature.  During his working life he published collections of poetry, gave talks for the Australian Broadcasting Commission on literary topics, wrote reviews and critical articles, and edited anthologies of Australian short stories and poetry.

He died in Canberra in 1978.

Bibliography

Novels

Poetry 
Collections
 Adagio in Blue : Poems (1938)
 Emu Parade : Poems from Camp (1941)
 Bayonet and Glass (1957)

Edited anthologies 
 Best Australian One-Act Plays (1937) compiled with William Moore
 Australian Poetry, 1946 (1946) poetry anthology
 Australia Writes (1953) poetry and fiction anthology
 Selected Poems of Henry Kendall (1957)
 Henry Kendall (1963) poetry of Henry Kendall
 From the Ballads to Brennan (1964) poetry anthology

Non-fiction 
 
 Rolf Boldrewood (1968) biography
 Social Patterns in Australian Literature (1971) criticism
 Six Australian Poets (1942) criticism and biography
 The Misfortunes of Henry Handel Richardson (1957) criticism
 Mary Gilmore : A Tribute (1965) edited with Barrie Ovenden and Dymphna Cusack
 Letters of Mary Gilmore (1980) edited with W. H. Wilde
 The Australia Book : The Portrait of a Nation by Our Greatest Writers (1982)

References

1901 births
1978 deaths
20th-century Australian writers
Meanjin people